Gamasellus virgosus is a species of mite in the family Ologamasidae.

References

virgosus
Articles created by Qbugbot
Animals described in 1966